Daraj (also Romanized as Darāj, Dārej, Dārij, and Darej; also known as Dāraj Bālā) is a village in Shakhenat Rural District, in the Central District of Birjand County, South Khorasan Province, Iran. At the 2006 census, its population was 242, in 66 families.

References 

Populated places in Birjand County